Jane Barrett (1922 – 1969) was an English actress. She worked extensively in radio, theatre and television. After The Captive Heart she signed a six-year contract with the Rank Organisation.

Select credits
The Captive Heart (1946)
Colonel Bogey (1948)
Eureka Stockade (1949)
Time Gentlemen, Please! (1952)
The Sword and the Rose (1953)
Bond of Fear (1956)
Change Partners (1965)

References

External links

20th-century British actresses
1922 births
1969 deaths